In mathematics, the multinomial theorem describes how to expand a power of a sum in terms of powers of the terms in that sum. It is the generalization of the binomial theorem from binomials to multinomials.

Theorem
For any positive integer  and any non-negative integer , the multinomial formula describes how a sum with  terms expands when raised to an arbitrary power :

where

is a multinomial coefficient. Also, as with the binomial theorem, quantities of the form  that appear are taken to equal 1 (even when  equals zero).

In the case , this statement reduces to that of the binomial theorem.

Example
The third power of the trinomial  is given by

This can be computed by hand using the distributive property of multiplication over addition, but it can also be done (perhaps more easily) with the multinomial theorem. It is possible to "read off" the multinomial coefficients from the terms by using the multinomial coefficient formula. For example:

 has the coefficient 
 has the coefficient

Alternate expression
The statement of the theorem can be written concisely using multiindices:

where

and

Proof

Then

 

by the induction hypothesis.  Applying the binomial theorem to the last factor,

which completes the induction.  The last step follows because

as can easily be seen by writing the three coefficients using factorials as follows:

Multinomial coefficients
The numbers

appearing in the theorem are the multinomial coefficients.  They can be expressed in numerous ways, including as a product of binomial coefficients or of factorials:

Sum of all multinomial coefficients

gives immediately that

Number of multinomial coefficients

The number of terms in a multinomial sum, is equal to the number of monomials of degree  on the variables :

The count can be performed easily using the method of stars and bars.

Valuation of multinomial coefficients
The largest power of a prime  that divides a multinomial coefficient may be computed using a generalization of Kummer's theorem.

Interpretations

Ways to put objects into bins
The multinomial coefficients have a direct combinatorial interpretation, as the number of ways of depositing  distinct objects into  distinct bins, with  objects in the first bin,  objects in the second bin, and so on.

Number of ways to select according to a distribution
In statistical mechanics and combinatorics, if one has a number distribution of labels, then the multinomial coefficients naturally arise from the binomial coefficients. Given a number distribution   on a set of  total items,  represents the number of items to be given the label .  (In statistical mechanics  is the label of the energy state.)

The number of arrangements is found by 
Choosing  of the total  to be labeled 1.  This can be done  ways.
From the remaining  items choose  to label 2.  This can be done  ways.
From the remaining  items choose  to label 3.  Again, this can be done  ways.

Multiplying the number of choices at each step results in:

Cancellation results in the formula given above.

Number of unique permutations of words

The multinomial coefficient 

is also the number of distinct ways to permute a multiset of  elements, where  is the multiplicity of each of the th element. For example, the number of distinct permutations of the letters of the word MISSISSIPPI, which has 1 M, 4 Is, 4 Ss, and 2 Ps, is

Generalized Pascal's triangle
One can use the multinomial theorem to generalize Pascal's triangle or Pascal's pyramid to Pascal's simplex. This provides a quick way to generate a lookup table for multinomial coefficients.

See also
 Multinomial distribution
 Stars and bars (combinatorics)

References

Factorial and binomial topics
Articles containing proofs
Theorems about polynomials